Team UK Youth was a British UCI Continental cycling team, competing from 2011 to 2013.

Profile
Founded in 2011 Team UK Youth were sponsored by UK Youth, a UK-based youth work charity. The team rode senior professional events in the United Kingdom and Europe, other than the Grand Tours and UCI ProTour races. For the 2012 season they expanded the team, joining the UCI Continental Circuits, and competing in the Tour of Britain.

The team was owned by former Formula One and Indycar champion Nigel Mansell.

At the end of the 2013 season, the team announced that unless a new headline sponsor could be found, they would not compete in 2014.

Major wins
2013
Rutland–Melton International CiCLE Classic, Ian Wilkinson
Overall Pearl Izumi Tour Series
Round 1 – Individual 1st, Yanto Barker
Round 3 – Team 1st; Individual 1st, Yanto Barker
Round 4 – Team 1st
Round 5 – Team 1st
Round 6 – Team 1st; Individual 1st, Jon Mould
Round 8 – Team 1st; Individual 1st, Chris Opie
Round 9 – Team 1st
Round 10 – Team 1st; Individual 1st, Chris Opie
Round 11 – Team 1st (team time trial)
Round 12 – Team 1st
Overall An Post Rás, Marcin Białobłocki

2013 team
As of 15 January 2013.

References

Mansell family
Cycling teams based in the United Kingdom
UCI Continental Teams (Europe)
Cycling teams established in 2011
Cycling teams disestablished in 2013